Pre-Christian Slavic writing is a hypothesized writing system that may have been used by the Slavs prior to Christianization and the introduction of the Glagolitic and Cyrillic alphabets. No extant evidence of pre-Christian Slavic writing exists, but early Slavic forms of writing or proto-writing may have been mentioned in several early medieval sources.

Evidence from early historiography
The 9th-century Bulgarian writer Chernorizets Hrabar, in his work An Account of Letters (O pismenĭhŭ), briefly mentions that, before becoming Christian, Slavs used a system he had dubbed  "strokes and incisions" or "tallies and sketches" in some translations (Old Church Slavonic: , črŭty i rězy). He also provided information critical to Slavonic palaeography with his book.

Another contemporaneous source, Thietmar of Merseburg, describing a Rethra temple remarked that the idols there had their names carved out on them ("singulis nominibus insculptis," Chronicon 6:23).

Evidence from archaeology

In 1949, a Kerch amphora was found in Gnezdovo in Smolensk Oblast, Russia, containing what may be the earliest inscription in Old East Slavic. The amphora was found in the grave of a Scandinavian merchant who traded with the Orient. The excavator read the one-word inscription as Cyrillic "гороухща" (goruhšča), inferring that it designated mustard that was kept there. This explanation has not been universally accepted and the inscription seems to be open to different interpretations. Other scholars have read the apparent "хщ" letter combination as an "N", resulting in a transcription as "гороуна" which could be either Cyrillic or Greek and which might represent an Arabic name Hārūn with possessive suffix (Härün's amphora). The inscription is dated to the early 10th century, which suggests a hitherto unsuspected popularity of the Cyrillic script in pre-Christian Rus. Different sources prove that the Slavic and Norse population of Russia had trade connections to the Muslim and Asian worlds.

 In 2021 new archaeological evidence of an early instance of writing among a Slavic population was published. In 2017 a cattle bone, dated 585–640 AD, with runes of the Germanic Elder Futhark was discovered in a Prague culture settlement near Břeclav in the Czech Republic. The inscription contains no recognizable words in either Slavic or any other language but seems to represent an attempt at an abecedary. It may have been incised by people of Germanic origin that remained in the region after the departure of the Lombards, or the runes may have been engraved by a Slav. In either case, the find attests to a direct interaction between the Slavic and Germanic ethnolinguistic groups.  If runic knowledge was transferred from Germanic peoples to Slavs, it must have happened in Central Europe as judged by the rune shapes or it may have persisted in the region as a result of population continuity between Lombards and Slavs.

Evidence against 
In the Vita Cyrilli, Rastislav, the duke of Moravia, sent an embassy to Constantinople asking Emperor Michael III to send learned men to the Slavs of Great Moravia, who being already baptised, wished to have the liturgy in their own language, and not Latin and Greek. Emperor called for Constantine and asked him if he would do this task, even though being in poor health. Constantine replied that he would gladly travel to Great Moravia and teach them, as long as the Slavs had their own alphabet to write their own language in, to which the Emperor replied that not even his grandfather and father and let alone he could find any evidence of such an alphabet. Constantine was distraught, and was worried that if he invents an alphabet for them he'll be labelled a heretic.

According to Alexey Karpov, this text is a later insertion in the chronicle, and its authenticity is questioned.

Footnotes

See also
Proto-writing
Christianization of the Slavs

References

Slavic culture
Palaeography
Slavonic inscriptions
Proto-writing